These are a list of player and club records for Huddersfield Town Association Football Club.

Club records

Victories
Record league victory: 10–1 v Blackpool, Division One, 13 December 1930
Record FA Cup victory: 11–0 v Heckmondwike, preliminary round, 18 September 1909
Record League Cup victory: 5–1 v Mansfield Town, first round, second leg, 13 September 1983

Defeats
 Record league defeat: 1–10 v Manchester City, Division Two, 7 November 1987
 Record FA Cup defeat: 0–6 v Sunderland, third round, 7 January 1950
 Record League Cup defeat: 0–5 v Arsenal, second round, first leg, 21 September 1993

Attendances
 Record attendance at Leeds Road: 67,037 v Arsenal, FA Cup Sixth Round, 27 February 1932
 Record attendance at John Smith's Stadium: 24,169 v Manchester United, Premier League, 21 October 2017

Sequences
Longest unbeaten league run: 43 – 1 January 2011 to 28 November 2011.
Longest unbeaten league run (in a single season): 25 – 1 January 2011 to 7 May 2011.
Longest unbeaten home league run: 28 – 5 May 1982 to 17 September 1983.
Longest unbeaten away league run: 22 – 1 January 2011 to 29 October 2011.
Longest run of league wins: 11 – 5 April 1920 to 9 September 1920.
Longest run of home league wins: 11 – 28 December 1925 to 30 August 1926.
Longest run of away league wins: 6 – 12 March 2011 to 30 April 2011.
Longest run of league defeats: 8 – 1 December 2018 to 2 January 2019.
Longest run of home league defeats: 7 – 1 December 2018 to 9 February 2019 and 2 March 2019 to 26 April 2019.
Longest run of away league defeats: 9 – 13 April 1912 to 16 November 1912, 14 November 1914 to 13 March 1915, 4 September 1946 to 7 December 1946 and 12 March 1988 to 3 October 1988.
Longest run of league draws: 6 – 3 March 1987 to 3 April 1987.
Longest run of home league draws: 6 – 3 May 1977 to 17 September 1977.
Longest run of away league draws: 6 – 28 August 1926 to 23 October 1926.
Longest run of league matches without a win: 22 – 27 November 1971 to 29 April 1972.
Longest run of matches without a win: 19 – 26 August 2000 to 25 November 2000.
Longest league scoring run: 27 – 12 March 2005 to 12 November 2005.
Longest league home scoring run: 21 – 26 December 2004 to 10 October 2005.
Longest league away scoring run: 24 – 20 January 1962 to 12 April 1963.
Longest league non-scoring run: 7 – 22 January 1972 to 21 March 1972.
Longest run of matches without conceding a goal: 8 – 13 March 1965 to 19 April 1965.
Longest run of wins at the start of a season: 4 – 1924–25 season.
Longest run of defeats at the start of a season: 6 – 1992–93 season.

Seasonal records
Most wins in a season: 28 – 1919–20 season.
Most home wins in a season: 16 – 1919–20 season, 1933–34 season, 1979–80 season and 2003–04 season.
Most away wins in a season: 13 – 2010–11 season.
Fewest wins in a season: 3 – 2018–19 season.
Fewest home wins in a season: 2 – 2018–19 season.
Fewest away wins in a season: 0 – 1936–37 season.
Most defeats in a season: 28 – 1987–88 season and 2018–19 season.
Most home defeats in a season: 14 – 2018–19 season.
Most away defeats in a season: 17 – 1974–75 season.
Fewest defeats in a season: 5 – 1924–25 season.
Fewest home defeats in a season: 0 – 1982–83 season.
Fewest away defeats in a season: 2 – 1924–25 season.
Most draws in a season: 18 – 2011–12 season.
Most home draws in a season: 9 – 1972–73 season, 1998–99 season and 2002–03 season.
Most away draws in a season: 12 – 2011–12 season.
Fewest draws in a season: 5 – 1937–38 season.
Fewest home draws in a season: 1 – 1987–88 season.
Fewest away draws in a season: 1 – 1911–12 season and 1988–89 season.

Tallies
Most league goals scored in a season: 101 – 1979–80 season.
Most home league goals scored in a season: 61 – 1979–80 season.
Most away league goals scored in a season: 44 – 2011–12 season.
Fewest league goals scored in a season: 22 – 2018–19 season.
Fewest home league goals scored in a season: 10 – 2018–19 season.
Fewest away league goals scored in a season: 12 – 2002–03 season and 2018–19 season.
Most league goals conceded in a season: 100 – 1987–88 season.
Most home league goals conceded in a season: 40 – 1950–51 season.
Most away league goals conceded in a season: 62 – 1987–88 season.
Fewest league goals conceded in a season: 28 – 1924–25 season.
Fewest home league goals conceded in a season: 9 – 1923–24 season.
Fewest away league goals conceded in a season: 17 – 1922–23 season.
Most points (two points for a win): 66 – 1979–80 season.
Most home points (two points for a win): 37 – 1979–80 season.
Most away points (two points for a win): 30 – 1924–25 season.
Fewest points (two points for a win): 25 – 1971–72 season.
Fewest home points (two points for a win): 15 – 1971–72 season.
Fewest away points (two points for a win): 7 – 1946–47 season and 1951–52 season.
Most points (three points for a win): 87 – 2010–11 season.
Most home points (three points for a win): 53 – 1982–83 season.
Most away points (three points for a win): 43 – 2010–11 season.
Fewest points (three points for a win): 16 – 2018–19 season.
Fewest home points (three points for a win): 9 – 2018–19 season.
Fewest away points (three points for a win): 7 – 2018–19 season.
Most clean sheets: 23 – 1922–23 season.
Most home clean sheets: 14 – 1980–81 season.
Most away clean sheets: 10 – 1922–23 season and 1975–76 season.
Fewest clean sheets: 5 – 2018–19 season.
Fewest home clean sheets: 2 – 1950–51 season.
Fewest away clean sheets: 0 – 1974–75 season.
Most times failed to score: 23 – 1971–72 season.
Most times failed to score at home: 12 – 1971–72 season.
Most times failed to score away: 13 – 2002–03 season.
Fewest times failed to score: 4 – 1930–21 season.
Fewest times failed to score at home: 1 – 1927–28 season, 1930–31 season and 1931–32 season.
Fewest times failed to score away: 2 – 1957–58 season.
Most doubles (home & away wins against same opponent) for: 9 – 1919–20 season.
Fewest doubles (home & away wins against same opponent) for: 0 – 1936–37 season, 1951–52 season, 1970–71 season, 1971–72 season, 1985–86 season and 1987–88 season.
Most doubles (home & away wins against same opponent) against: 11 – 2018–19 season.
Fewest doubles (home & away wins against same opponent) against: 0 – 1912–13 season, 1919–20 season, 1923–24 season, 1924–25 season, 1925–26 season, 1926–27 season, 1935–36 season, 1954–55 season, 1961–62 season, 1969–70 season, 1982–83 season, 2003–04 season and 2010–11 season.

Player records

Appearances
The following players have played more than 250 league and cup appearances for Huddersfield Town. Statistics correct up to 18 March 2023.

Most appearances : 574 – Billy Smith.
Most league appearances: 521 – Billy Smith.
Most consecutive appearances : 259 – Malcolm Brown.
Most consecutive league appearances : 226 – Malcolm Brown.
Most consecutive FA Cup appearances : 52 – Tom Wilson.
Most consecutive FL Cup appearances : 22 – Malcolm Brown.

Goals
The following players have scored more than 40 league and cup goals for Huddersfield Town. Statistics correct up to 29 December 2022.

Most goals scored : 159 – George Brown.
Most league goals: 142 – George Brown & Jimmy Glazzard.
Most goals in a season: 42 – Sammy Taylor – 1919–20 season.
Most league goals in a season: 36 – Jordan Rhodes – 2011–12 season.
Most goals scored in a match: 5 – Dave Mangnall v Derby County – 21 November 1931, Alf Lythgoe v Blackburn Rovers – 13 April 1935 and Jordan Rhodes v Wycombe Wanderers – 6 January 2012.

Scoring records
These players have achieved the best consecutive scoring runs in the club's history.

11 matches –  Dave Mangnall – 2 January – 13 February 1932.
7 matches –  Jimmy Glazzard – 8 January – 23 February 1955.
7 matches –  George Brown – 27 December 1927 – 28 January 1928.
7 matches –  Sammy Taylor – 3–17 April 1920.
7 matches –  Walter Smith – 12 February – 12 March 1910.
6 matches –  Anthony Pilkington – 5 October – 2 November 2010.
6 matches –  Paweł Abbott – 6–27 August 2005.
6 matches –  Jimmy Glazzard – 16 October – 20 November 1954.
6 matches –  George Brown – 23 October – 27 November 1926.

Transfers
Highest transfer fee paid: £17,500,000 (€20 million) – Terence Kongolo, from Monaco, June 2018.
Highest transfer fee received: £15 million~ – Philip Billing, to AFC Bournemouth, July 2019.

Youngest debutant
Youngest player: 16 years, 229 days – Peter Hart v Southend United, 30 March 1974

References

99 Years & Counting – Stats & Stories – Huddersfield Town History

Records and Statistics
Huddersfield Town